Changde Vocational and Technical College (college code 13039) is a post-secondary institution in Changde, Hunan in China. In 2003 the Changde Agricultural School, the Changde Hygiene School and the Changde Mechatronic Engineering School merged to form the Changde Vocational and Technical College.

References

External links
 Changde Vocational and Technical College
 Changde Vocational and Technical College 

Universities and colleges in Hunan
Changde
2003 establishments in China
Educational institutions established in 2003